Xichuan County is a county in the southwest of Henan province, China, bordering the provinces of Hubei to the south and Shaanxi to the northwest. It is under the administration of the prefecture-level city of Nanyang.

Both of the Danjiangkou Reservoir and the Central route of South–North Water Transfer Project's canal head  are located in Xichuan.

History
The state of Chu's first capital Danyang was in Xichuan.

Geography

Xichuan is located south of Funiu Mountain. The county is about 107 kilometers from northwest to southeast, with a width of 46 kilometers and a total area of 2,798 square kilometers. Xichuan County is a horseshoe-shaped terrain that protrudes to the southeast in the northwest direction. The northwest is a low mountain area, the middle is a hilly area, and the southeast is a hilly and alluvial plain. Danjiangkou Reservoir is located in the south of the county. The northern and northwestern parts of the county belong to the eastern part of the Qinling mountains. On the south side of the Funiu Mountains, the mountain body is roughly east–west. The mountains about 900 meters above sea level extend from north to south. There are the Daba Mountains in the west and southwest of the county. The elevation of the east and west peaks at the junction of Zoumaling and Hubei is 1,033 meters. 1086 meters is the highest peak of the county. The east side of the Danjiangkou Reservoir belongs to the southwestern margin of the Nanyang Basin and is flat and ridge-like.

Climate

Administrative divisions
Xichuan has 2 subdistricts, 11 towns, and 4 townships:

Subdistricts 
Longcheng Subdistrict, Shangsheng Subdistrict

Towns 
Jingziguan, Laocheng, Xianghua, Houpo, Jiuchong, Shengwan, Jinhe, Siwan, Cangfang, Shangji, Madeng

Townships 
Xihuang Township, Maotang Township, Dashiqiao Township, Taohe Township

Notable people
Fan Li, the politician and economist of the country in the late Spring and Autumn Period.
Fan Ye, famous historian and essayist in the Southern Song Dynasty.
Fan Zhen, (about 450 years - 515 years), materialist philosopher, atheist.
Famous poet Chou Meng-tieh was born in Xichuan County in 1921.

References

External links

  Official website of Xichuan County government

 
County-level divisions of Henan
Nanyang, Henan